The 34th Norwegian Biathlon Championships were held in Skrautvål, Oppland, Norway from 9 January to 12 January 1992 at the stadium Valdres Skisenter, arranged by Skrautvål IL. There were 6 scheduled competitions: individual, sprint, and relay races for men and women. The team races for men and women were held on 22 March, concurrently with the final races of the Norwegian Biathlon Cup (Norgescupen), in Målselv, at the stadium Bardufoss Skisenter.

For the first time, NRK, the Norwegian government-owned radio and television public broadcasting company, broadcast the championship races in Skrautvål live on television.

Schedule
All times are local (UTC+1).

Medal winners

Men

Women

References

Norwegian Biathlon Championships
1992 in biathlon
1992 in Norwegian sport
January 1992 sports events in Europe